Tuhobić is a mountain in Gorski Kotar, Croatia. Its highest peaks are at 1,109 and 1,106 m.a.s.l.

The eponymous Tuhobić Tunnel passes underneath the mountain.

References

Mountains of Croatia
Landforms of Primorje-Gorski Kotar County